Littorina is a genus of small sea snails, marine gastropod molluscs in the family Littorinidae, the winkles or periwinkles.

These small snails live in the tidal zone of rocky shores.

Overview

In Europe there are about nine species in this genus, one of which is the rough periwinkle, Littorina saxatilis (Olivi, 1792). Another closely related (supposed) species Littorina tenebrosa (Montagu 1802) was thought to be distinct because of its different ecological requirements, but current studies have shown that it is not at all clear whether the two are indeed separate species or whether L. tenebrosa is perhaps merely an ecotype (an ecological form) of L. saxatilis.

Littorina has given its name to the Littorina Sea, the geologic precursor of the Baltic Sea.

Distribution
The periwinkles are found on the seashore in the littoral zone and sublittoral zone  in all parts of the world. In the Baltic they live within the influence of freshwater, and frequently become distorted in consequence.

Description
The thick, pointed shell is turbinated and has few whorls. The aperture is rounded. The outer lip is acute. The  columella is rather flattened and imperforate. The operculum is paucispiral. The lingual teeth are hooked and trilobed. The uncini (small teeth on the radula) are hooked and dentated.

Species
The type species:Turbo littoreus Linnaeus, 1758 restricts the species in this genus to the northern hemisphere, moderate and cold zones. The tropical species belong in other genera of the same family 

Species in the genus Littorina include  
 
 Littorina aleutica Dall, 1872
 Littorina arcana Hannaford-Ellis, 1978
 Littorina brevicula (Philippi, 1844)
 Littorina compressa Jeffreys, 1865
 Littorina fabalis (Turton, 1825)
 Littorina horikawai Matsubayashi & Habe in Habe, 1979
 Littorina islandica Reid, 1996 †
 Littorina kasatka Reid, Zaslavskaya & Sergievsky, 1991
 Littorina keenae Rosewater, 1978
 Littorina littorea (Linnaeus, 1758), Common periwinkle
 Littorina mandshurica (Schrenk, 1861)
 Littorina natica Reid, 1996
 Littorina obtusata (Linnaeus, 1758), flat periwinkle
 Littorina petricola Arnold, 1908 †
 Littorina plena Gould, 1849
 Littorina remondii Gabb, 1866 †
 Littorina saxatilis (Olivi, 1792), rough periwinkle
 Littorina scutulata Gould, 1849, checkered periwinkle
 Littorina sitkana Philippi, 1846
 Littorina sookensis  Clark & Arnold, 1923  †
 Littorina squalida  Broderip & Sowerby, 1829 
 Littorina subrotundata  (Carpenter, 1864) 
 Littorina varia 
 Littorina zebra 

Species brought into synonymy
 Littorina aestuarii Jeffreys, 1865: synonym of Littorina obtusata (Linnaeus, 1758)
 Littorina affinis d'Orbigny, 1839: synonym of Tectarius striatus (King & Broderip, 1832)
 Littorina angulifera is a synonym for Littoraria angulifera (Lamarck, 1822)
 Littorina arenica Jay, 1839: synonym of Tectarius striatus (King & Broderip, 1832)
 Litorina arenica Dunker, 1845: synonym of Tectarius striatus (King & Broderip, 1832)
 Littorina canariensis d'Orbigny, 1839: synonym of  Tectarius striatus (King & Broderip, 1832)
 Littorina cingulifera R. W. Dunker, 1845: synonym of  Littoraria cingulifera R. W. Dunker, 1845
 Litorina globosa Dunker, 1845: synonym of  Tectarius striatus (King & Broderip, 1832)
 Littorina granularis Gray, 1839: synonym of Echinolittorina miliaris (Quoy & Gaimard, 1833)
 Littorina lamellosa Souverbie, 1861: synonym of Fossarus lamellosus (Souverbie, 1861)
 Littorina marnat Potiez & Michaud, 1838: synonym of Echinolittorina punctata (Gmelin, 1791)
 Littorina obesa (G.B. Sowerby, 1832): synonym of Littoraria coccinea (Gmelin, 1791)
 Littorina petraeus (Montagu, 1803): synonym of Melarhaphe neritoides (Linnaeus, 1758)
 Littorina planaxis G.B. Sowerby I, 1844: synonym of  Tectarius striatus (King & Broderip, 1832)
 Littorina saxatilis jugosa Montagu, 1803: synonym of Littorina saxatilis (Olivi, 1792)
 Littorina saxatilis nigrolineata Gray, 1839: synonym of Littorina saxatilis (Olivi, 1792)
 Littorina striata is a synonym for Tectarius striatus (King & Broderip, 1832) 
 Littorina undulata Gray, 1839: synonym of Littoraria undulata (Gray, 1839)
 Littorina unifasciata antipodum: synonym of Austrolittorina antipodum (Philippi, 1847) 
 Littorina ziczac is a synonym for Echinolittorina ziczac (Gmelin, 1791)
 Littorina zonaria Bean, 1844: synonym of Littorina saxatilis (Olivi, 1792)

References

 Reid D.G. (1996). Systematics and evolution of Littorina. The Ray Society 463p

Gastropod genera
Littorinidae